Stephen Vagg is an Australian writer. He wrote the films All My Friends Are Leaving Brisbane, based on his play, and Jucy, as well as a number of plays and episodes of the television soaps Home and Away and Neighbours. He is the author of Rod Taylor: An Aussie in Hollywood, a biography of actor Rod Taylor, as well as a number of articles on film and theatre history. He received an AFI nomination for All My Friends Are Leaving Brisbane. At the 2014 AWGIE Awards, Vagg won Best Script for a Television Serial for "Episode 6857" of Neighbours.

Selected credits

Films
All My Friends Are Leaving Brisbane (2007) – feature film – writer, associate producer, actor
Jucy (2010) – feature film – writer, executive producer

Television
McLeod's Daughters (2001) – researcher
Young Lions (2001) – trainee script editor
Out of the Blue (2008) – writer, script associate
Home and Away (2009–13) – core writer, script editor, associate script producer
Howzat! Kerry Packer's War (2012) – researcher
Neighbours (2013–) – writer, supervising script editor, story producer

Plays
All My Friends Are Leaving Brisbane
Dirty Caff
Friday Night Drinks
Nerd Formal
Rebel Tour
Trivia
Love Song Dedications
Tom and Nicole and Russell and Friends
Sidekicks

Books
The Quarter Life Crisis: A Collection of Plays (2006) – plays – writer
Rod Taylor: An Aussie in Hollywood (2010) – book – writer

References

External links
Personal website

Stephen Vagg at National Film and Sound Archive
Stephen Vagg Australian theatre credits at AusStage

Australian dramatists and playwrights
Living people
Year of birth missing (living people)